The Voice That Is! is an album by American jazz vocalist Johnny Hartman featuring performances recorded in 1964 for the Impulse! label.

Reception
The Allmusic review by Scott Yanow awarded the album 4 stars and stated "Hartman is in fine form whether backed by the Hank Jones quartet or accompanied by an octet arranged by pianist Bob Hammer, but this set is not as essential as his earlier meetings with John Coltrane and Illinois Jacquet".

Track listing
 "My Ship" (Ira Gershwin, Kurt Weill) – 3:08 
 "The More I See You" Mack Gordon, Harry Warren) – 2:26 
 "These Foolish Things" (Harry Link, Holt Marvell, Jack Strachey) – 4:17 
 "Waltz for Debby" (Bill Evans, Gene Lees) – 3:44 
 "It Never Entered My Mind" (Lorenz Hart, Richard Rodgers) – 3:35 
 "The Day the World Stopped Turning" (Buddy Kaye, Phillip Springer) – 2:29 
 "A Slow Hot Wind" (Norman Gimbel, Henry Mancini) – 3:23 
 "Funny World" (Alan Brandt, Ennio Morricone) – 4:08 
 "Joey, Joey, Joey" (Frank Loesser) – 4:24 
 "Let Me Love You" (Bart Howard) – 1:45 
 "Sunrise, Sunset" (Jerry Bock, Sheldon Harnick) – 2:48

Personnel
Johnny Hartman – vocals
Dick Hafer – reeds (tracks 6–11)
Phil Kraus – marimba (tracks 6–11)
Howard Collins (tracks 6–11), Barry Galbraith – guitar
Hank Jones – piano (tracks 1–5)
Bob Hammer – piano, arranger (tracks 6–11)
Richard Davis – bass
Osie Johnson – drums
Willie Rodriguez – percussion

References 

Impulse! Records albums
Johnny Hartman albums
1964 albums
Albums produced by Bob Thiele
Albums recorded at Van Gelder Studio